Abdel Monem Salem (born 5 January 1955) is an Egyptian former fencer. He competed in the individual and team épée events at the 1984 Summer Olympics.

References

External links
 

1955 births
Living people
Egyptian male épée fencers
Olympic fencers of Egypt
Fencers at the 1984 Summer Olympics
20th-century Egyptian people
21st-century Egyptian people